Dequantes Lamar (born October 4, 1989), known professionally as Rich Homie Quan, is an American rapper. He was previously signed to labels T.I.G. Entertainment and Motown, and is an independent artist as of 2021. Quan experienced commercial success with the 2013 single "Type of Way" (which peaked at number 50 on the Billboard Hot 100), and the 2015 single "Flex (Ooh, Ooh, Ooh)" (peaking at number 26). In addition, Quan joined the Cash Money Records spin-off project, Rich Gang in 2014, which had successful singles such as "Lifestyle" and the mixtape Rich Gang: Tha Tour Pt. 1 (2014). Quan's debut studio album Rich as in Spirit was released on March 16, 2018, and debuted at number 32 on the US Billboard 200.

Early life 
Dequantes Lamar was born on October 4, 1989 in Atlanta, Georgia. In school, Lamar had a particular interest in reading. Literature was his favorite subject and he enjoyed creative writing classes. He played baseball for over four years while he attended Atlanta, Georgia's Ronald McNair Sr. High School with the aspiration to play professionally. As center fielder and leadoff hitter, Lamar began playing at the varsity level during his freshman year and earned a scholarship offer from Fort Valley State University. While Lamar decided to focus his interests elsewhere, he began rapping and got a job at a nearby airport. When he lost his job, Lamar got involved in illegal activities, including burglary that eventually led to him serving 15 months in prison. "I never saw myself going this far with music. Music was just a hobby at first. I never saw myself being on stage and rocking out shows. After I got out of jail, I started to take it more serious and that's when my dream came true", he said in an interview with XXL. Rich Homie Quan was influenced by dirty south music, including Jeezy, Gucci Mane, T.I., Lil Boosie, Lil Wayne, Kilo Ali, Outkast, and Goodie Mob.

Career 

In 2012, Lamar's song "Differences" was released as the first single from his mixtape Still Going In. In 2013, he toured with Trinidad James. He was also featured on Gucci Mane's album Trap House III on songs such as "I Heard", "Can't Trust Her" and "Chasin' Paper", which also features Young Thug. Reviewing his single, "Type of Way", The New York Times wrote that he was "part of Atlanta's rising generation of rappers—think Future, Young Thug, Young Scooter—who deliver lines with melody and heart, like singers on the verge of a breakdown". The song peaked at number 50 on the US Billboard Hot 100. Still Goin' In (Reloaded) would be named the tenth best mixtape of 2013 by Rolling Stone.

In August 2013, "Type of Way" was released to the iTunes Store by Def Jam Recordings, suggesting that he had signed to the well-known hip hop-based record label Wash House Entertainment. However, Rich Homie Quan was still independent and was considering signing a deal with Cash Money Records. Quan was featured on the song "My Nigga" by YG also featuring Young Jeezy, which peaked at number 19 on the Hot 100. He was also featured on 2 Chainz' second studio album B.O.A.T.S. II: Me Time, on the song "Extra". In September 2013, he confirmed that he was 30% done with his debut album. His mixtape, called I Promise I'll Never Stop Going In was released on November 26, 2013. It was supported by the single "Walk Thru" featuring Problem. The 2013 Michigan State Spartans football team adopted "Type of Way" as an anthem, and Quan joined them on the sidelines in a green jersey at the 100th Rose Bowl, while also participating in their post-game locker-room celebration singing "Type of Way". He was named to the 2014 XXL freshman class.

On May 6, 2014, Rich Homie Quan went home to Atlanta to shoot the video for his single "Walk Thru" with Los Angeles rapper Problem. Hours later, it was reported that he had two "seizures," falling and "cracking his head" on set, according to TMZ. Rich Homie Quan cleared up the rumors by sending Billboard a statement saying that he fainted and hit his head. In this statement, he also denied that the instance had anything to do with drugs. On September 29, 2014, he was part of the mixtape, called Rich Gang: Tha Tour Pt. 1. His song "Flex (Ooh, Ooh, Ooh)" and its music video were released on April 1, 2015, on YouTube.

On March 16, 2017, Rich Homie Quan made his return to music by releasing his first single since 2015, "Replay". A mixtape, Back to the Basics followed on April 14, 2017. His debut album Rich as in Spirit was released on March 18, 2018. The album was supported by the two singles, "Changed" and "34".

Legal issues 
In November 2016, Quan sued former label, "Think It's A Game" for 2 million dollars because of unpaid royalties. The label counter sued him for breach of contract. Both Quan and the label settled the issues outside of court.

On May 28, 2017, Quan was arrested with four others on felony drug charges after being stopped at a checkpoint on Highway 1 in Louisville, Georgia. Police claimed to have recovered heroin, marijuana, drug paraphernalia and weapons from the vehicle. Quan was charged with felony drug possession with an intent to distribute.

Personal life 
As of 2022, Lamar has four sons.

Discography 

Studio albums
 Rich as in Spirit (2018)

Awards and nominations

References

External links 
 Official website

 
1989 births
Living people
American male rappers
Rappers from Atlanta
Rappers from Georgia (U.S. state)
Southern hip hop musicians
21st-century American rappers
Mumble rappers